Rajagopal or Raja Gopal is a common name in India. Notable persons with that name include:

Chandran Rajagopal (1974–2001), Indian foreign worker and murderer executed in Singapore
Rajagopal (professor and researcher), Indian business and marketing expert
Rajagopal Muthukumaraswamy (born 1936), publisher, librarian, translator and scholar
Rajagopal P. V. (born 1948), Indian Gandhian activist
Rajagopal Sathish (born 1981), Indian cricketer
Rajagopal Seziyan (1923–2017), Indian writer
A. Rajagopal, Indian politician, social worker, and lawyer
Cadambathur Tiruvenkatacharlu Rajagopal (1903–1978), Indian mathematician
Dandamudi Rajagopal (1916–1981), Indian weightlifter, bodybuilder, actor, sports administrator, and coach
Heera Rajagopal (born 1971), Indian actress
Jijoy Rajagopal (born 1977), Indian actor
Lagadapati Rajagopal (born 1964), Indian politician
K. Rajagopal (born 1956), Malaysian football player and coach
Kuderu Rajagopal (born 1953), Indian educator
M. R. Rajagopal (born 1947), Indian  physician
Nisha Rajagopal (born 1980), Indian musician
O. Rajagopal (born 1929), Indian politician
P. Rajagopal (Ambur MLA), Indian politician
P. Rajagopal (businessman) (1947–2019), Indian businessman
Pakkiri Rajagopal, Indian-American politician
Rosalind Rajagopal (1903–1996), American educator 
V. Rajagopal (born 1927), Indian cricket umpire
Vatsala Rajagopal (born 1933), Indian actress